Pete Dunne may refer to:

 Pete Dunne (author) (fl. 2001–2009), American author
 Pete Dunne (born 1993), wrestler and promoter

See also
Pete Dunn (born 1948), baseball coach
Peter Dunne (disambiguation)